Jesse Browner (born March 30, 1961) is an American novelist, essayist, and translator. His work has appeared in Nest (magazine), Food & Wine, Gastronomica, New York (magazine), The New York Times Book Review and Poets & Writers. His books have been published in the United States, France, Italy, Poland, Germany and the Netherlands.

Life 
Browner was born in New York City and grew up there and in Europe. He is a 1983 graduate of Bard College, where he earned a B.A. in English.

Books 
 Conglomeros, Random House, 1992
 Turnaway, Random House, 1996 
 The Duchess Who Wouldn't Sit Down, Bloomsbury, 2003
 The Uncertain Hour, Bloomsbury, 2007 
 Everything Happens Today, Europa, 2011
 How Did I Get Here, HarperCollins, 2015

Translations 
 Diary of an Unknown, Jean Cocteau, Paragon House, 1988 -
 Oriental Metaphysics, René Guénon, Hanuman Books, 1989 -
 Letters to Merline, Rainer Maria Rilke, Paragon House, 1989 -
 Letter to Gala, Paul Eluard, Paragon House, 1989 -
 Souvenir Portraits, Jean Cocteau, Paragon House, 1989 -
 Celine: A Biography, Frederic Vitoux, Paragon House, 1992 -
 The Bad Life, Frédéric Mitterrand, Soft Skull, 2010 -
 Happiness: A Guide to Developing Life's Most Important Skill, Matthieu Ricard, Little Brown, 2011 -
 Monsieur le Commandant, Romain Slocombe, Gallic Books, 2013 -

References

1961 births
Living people
Writers from New York City